Chimerothalassius is a genus of flies in the family Dolichopodidae. It contains five described species, two from New Zealand, two from New Caledonia and one from the Caribbean. It also contains three undescribed species, two from New Zealand and one from Costa Rica.

Species
 Chimerothalassius ismayi Shamshev & Grootaert, 2003 – New Zealand
 Chimerothalassius marshalli Brooks & Cumming, 2022 – New Zealand
 Chimerothalassius riparius Brooks & Cumming, 2022 – New Caledonia
 Chimerothalassius runyoni Brooks & Cumming, 2018 – Montserrat, Dominica
 Chimerothalassius sinclairi Brooks & Cumming, 2022 – New Caledonia

References

Dolichopodidae genera
Parathalassiinae
Diptera of Australasia
Diptera of North America